is the pen name of a Japanese manga artist who created The Recipe for Gertrude, Palette of 12 Secret Colors, and Two Flowers of the Dragon. Her real name has not been made public.

She debuted in 2000 with the short story , published in the manga magazine LaLa DX.

References

External links
  

Living people
Manga artists from Aichi Prefecture
Year of birth missing (living people)
Unidentified people
21st-century pseudonymous writers
Pseudonymous women writers